Colonel Lord William Richard Percy CBE DSO (17 May 1882 - 8 February 1963) was a British military officer who served in the Grenadier Guards during the First World War.

Percy attended the University of Oxford where he was a member of the Bullingdon Club.

Percy was mentioned in dispatches and appointed Commander of the Royal Order of George I, King of Greece.

References 

1882 births
1963 deaths
Younger sons of dukes
Alumni of the University of Oxford
Commanders of the Order of George I
Grenadier Guards officers
Companions of the Distinguished Service Order
British Army personnel of World War I
Commanders of the Order of the British Empire